Ye Xiaogang (born September 23, 1955) is one of China's most active and most famous composers of contemporary classical music.

Biography
Ye was born in Shanghai in 1955. He studied at the Central Conservatory of Music in Beijing from 1978 to 1983, under the composer Du Mingxin. He then studied at the Eastman School of Music beginning in 1987. His teachers include Alexander Goehr.

He teaches at the Central Conservatory of Music, where he serves as Assistant President and vice dean of the composition department.

His Starry Sky was premiered at the opening ceremony of the 2008 Summer Olympics in Beijing. In the summer of 2006, Ye took part in the inaugural "Composer Alive!" transpacific correspondence project with Accessible Contemporary Music in Chicago, Illinois. This project consisted of Ye composing a piece, Datura, and sending its fragments as they were completed to Chicago, electronically. They were subsequently read by ACM's performance ensemble and posted to the Internet for Ye's approval. The project culminated with Ye traveling to the United States for the completed work's premiere performance.

Selected compositions
The Great Wall Symphony (2002) consists of nine movements, with vocal parts and traditional Chinese musical instruments and folk tunes are used in it. Ye composed the soundtrack to the documentary Rise of the Great Powers.

Vocal
Twilight in Tibet for tenor, horn and orchestra, op. 41 (2002)
The Song of the Earth for soprano, baritone and orchestra, op. 47
Poems of Lingnan for tenor, op. 62 (2011)
Seven Episodes for Lin'an for soprano, tenor, bariton and orchestra, op. 63 (2011)
The Road to the Republic (Cantate) (2011)
The song of sorrow and gratification for Bassbariton and orchestra, op. 67 (2012)

Orchestral
Winter for orchestra, op. 28 (1988)
Cantonese Suite for orchestra, op. 51 (2005)
Sichuan Image op. 70
Tinjin Suite for orchestra, op. 75 (2015-2016)

Symphonies
Symphony No.2 "Horizon" for soprano, baritone and orchestra, op. 20 (1984/85)
Great Wall Symphony (2002)
Symphony No.3 "Chu" op. 46 (2004/207)
Symphony No.4 "Songs from the Steppe"
Symphony No.5 "Lu Xun"
Symphony No.7 "The Heroes"

Concerto's
The brilliance of Western Liang for violin and orchestra, op. 16 (1983)
The Last Paradise for violin and orchestra, op. 24 (1993)
Concerto of Life for piano and orchestra, op. 23c (2000)
Pipa Concerto op. 31 (2001)
Scent of Green Mango for piano and orchestra, op.42 (1998-2014)
December chrysanthemum for flute and orchestra, op. 52b 
Starry sky for piano and orchestra, op. 56 (2008)
Lamura Cuo for violin and orchestra, op.69b (2014)
Mount E'mei for violin and orchestra, op.64 (2015-2016)

Chamber music
Springs in the Forest for zheng, op. 6
Poem of China for cello and piano, op. 15 (1981)
San Die for zheng and flute op. 7a (1986)
Enchanted Bamboo for piano, violin (2), viola and cello, op. 18
Hibiscus for 6 players op. 48
December Chrysanthemum for flute and piano, op. 52
Namucuo for piano, op. 53
Datura for flute, violin, cello and piano, op. 57
Colorful Sutra Banner trio for piano, violin and cello, op. 58
Piano Trio op. 59
Basong Cuo op. 65 for zheng and 5 players, op.65 (2012)
Gardenia for pipa and string quartet, op. 78 (2017)

Other
Therenody
Tripdus
Ballade op. 25
Shenzhen Story
Macau Bride (Ballet-Suite) op. 34 (2001)
Dalai VI
Nine Horses
Rise of the Great Powers (2006)
The Silence of Mount Minshan for strings, op. 73 (2015)

Recordings 

 Symphony Nr.2 "Horizon"— Wergo WER6646-2 (2004)
 The Macau Bride op.34 (Ballett-Suite) — Naxos 8.573131 (2014)
 Symphony Nr.3 "Chu"— BIS records BIS-2083 (2016)
 December Chrysanthemum (Chamber Music) — Delos DE3559 (2020)
 Winter— BIS records BIS-2113 (2021)
 Violin Concerto op.64 "Mount E'mei" — Naxos 8.579087 (2021)
 Mahler & Ye: The Song Of The Earth — Deutsche Grammophon (2021)
 The Road to the Republic (Cantate) — Naxos 8.579089 (2021)
 7 Episodes for Lin'an op.63 — Naxos 8.579088 (2022)
 Sichuan Image op.70— BIS records BIS-2303 (2022)

Sources

External links
"Ye Xiaogang: Contemporary Composer", CCTV.com. Interview, 2004.
"High and Low Notes of Life Give Composer His Inspiration", CRIEnglish.com. Article, 2005-11-22 16:37:19.

1955 births
Living people
20th-century classical composers
People's Republic of China composers
21st-century classical composers
Musicians from Shanghai
Pupils of Alexander Goehr
Pupils of Louis Andriessen
Pupils of Samuel Adler (composer)
Pupils of Joseph Schwantner
Central Conservatory of Music alumni
Academic staff of the Central Conservatory of Music
Eastman School of Music alumni
Chinese male classical composers
Chinese classical composers
20th-century male musicians
21st-century male musicians